Ian Kenneth Blackstone (born 7 August 1964 in Harrogate, England) is an English former footballer.

External links

1964 births
Living people
Sportspeople from Harrogate
English footballers
Association football forwards
Harrogate Town A.F.C. players
York City F.C. players
Scarborough F.C. players
Southport F.C. players